Sir John Holland, 2nd Baronet (c. 1669 – by July 1724), of Quidenham Hall, Norfolk was a British Whig politician who sat in the English and British House of Commons from 1701 to 1710.

Early life

Holland was the second, but eldest surviving son of Thomas Holland of Bury St  Edmunds, Suffolk, and  his second wife Elizabeth Meade, daughter of Thomas Meade of Wenden Lofts, Essex. He was educated at Bury St Edmunds grammar school under Mr Leeds, and was at Christ's College, Cambridge from September 1685 to 1687. He succeeded his father in 1698. 

In May 1699, he married Lady Rebecca Paston, daughter of William Paston, 2nd Earl of Yarmouth and his wife Charlotte FitzRoy, illegitimate daughter of Charles II of England. He succeeded his grandfather Sir John Holland, 1st Baronet to the baronetcy and  Quidenham on 19 January 1701.

Career
Holland was returned in a contest as Member of Parliament for Norfolk at the second general election of 1701. He made his  first recorded speech  on 24 February 1702 and was a teller for the Whigs six times. He was returned again at the 1702 English general election and continued to be very active in Parliament, particularly as a teller for the Whigs. At the 1705 English general election he was returned unopposed as a Whig MP for Norfolk. He seconded the nomination of the Court's candidate    for Speaker on 25 October 1705 and acted as teller for the Whigs on several occasions. He was returned again as a Whig for Norfolk at the 1708 British general election. In March 1708 he spoke for the Bishop of Carlisle’s cathedrals bill, and was appointed on 11 March to the committee  to draw up an address to press for  continued vigorous prosecution of the war, and  subsequently reported from the committee. He voted for the naturalization of the Palatines in 1709. In March 1709  he was appointed Comptroller of the Household, and was sworn a Privy Counsellor on 2 June 1709. On 14 December 1709 he was asked to prepare the articles of impeachment against Dr Sacheverell, and became a manager of the impeachment. He  voted for the impeachment and helped present the prosecution’s case on 28 February 1710. The Norfolk Whigs decided not to put him forward  at the 1710 British general election, probably  because his fellow Whigs did not like his generally remiss behaviour, and he was unable to secure another seat then or at the 1713 British general election. He was dismissed from his office in the household in June 1711 but he was paid his arrears of salary and was given an extra £250 as royal bounty in 1712.

Holland did not receive anything from George I and turned against the Norfolk Whig establishment. He did not stand at the 1715 British general election, but challenged the Townsend-Walpole interest unsuccessfully at Great Yarmouth at the 1722 British general election.

Death and legacy
Holland died in about 1724, and was buried at Quidenham. Through his wife, Rebecca, their two sons and three daughters were great-grandchildren of Charles II. He was succeeded in the baronetcy by his son William.

References

1660s births
18th-century deaths
Year of birth uncertain
Year of death unknown
Baronets in the Baronetage of England

Members of the Parliament of England for Norfolk
Members of the Parliament of Great Britain for Norfolk
English MPs 1701–1702
English MPs 1702–1705
English MPs 1705–1707
British MPs 1707–1708
British MPs 1708–1710
Members of the Privy Council of Great Britain